Noorderhaaks, also called Razende Bol (Raging sandbank in Dutch; in modern Dutch Bol means sphere, but in this context the old Dutch meaning of sandbank is meant), is an uninhabited Dutch island in the North Sea, a few kilometres west of the Marsdiep which separates the island of Texel from the mainland of the Netherlands. The island covers an area of around five km², although the exact area varies due to tide and the dynamic nature of the area.

Being relatively untouched by man, the island has become a valuable location due to its presence of several kinds of seabirds, and seals.

The island is slowly moving eastward towards the Marsdiep and the Molengat, at a pace of around 100 metres a year. Noorderhaaks is probably the sixth sand bar to develop in the mouth of the Marsdiep, since it formed in the late twelfth century via a flood that occurred in 1170. The previous five have also moved towards Texel and got accreted to the island, with intervals of approximately 150 years each.

The island is visited by day trippers, and is also being used as a training ground for the Royal Dutch Navy and Air Force.

References

External links 
 

Texel
Islands of North Holland
Uninhabited islands of the Netherlands
West Frisian Islands